NFE may refer to:

 Naval Auxiliary Landing Field Fentress, a military airport in Virginia, USA (by FAA LID code)
 Nearly free electron model
 Non-formal education
 New French Extremity
 Nordisk familjebok ecology